Evil is the absence or opposite of good. 

Evil may also refer to:

Fictional characters
 Evil the Cat, a villain from the Earthworm Jim cartoon series
 Dr. Evil, a character from the Austin Powers series of films

Film, literature and television 
 The Evil (1978 film), an American horror film
 Evil (novel), a 1981 Swedish novel by Jan Guillou
 Evil (2003 film), a Swedish film based on Guillou's novel
 Evil (2005 film), a Greek horror film
 Evil: In the Time of Heroes, a 2009 Greek horror film prequel of the 2005 film
 Evil, alternate title of the 2006 Russian film The Power of Fear
 Evil (TV series), a 2019 supernatural drama

Music 
 Evil (band), a Miami garage group, active 1965–1967
 "Evil" (Earth, Wind & Fire song), 1973
 "Evil" (Grinderman song), 2010
 "Evil" (Howlin' Wolf song), 1954, written by Willie Dixon
 "Evil" (Interpol song), 2005
 "Evil" (Ladytron song), 2003
 "Evil (A Chorus of Resistance)", a song by Project 86 from their album Rival Factions
 "Evil", a song by Baboon from Something Good Is Going to Happen to You
 "Evil", a song by Mercyful Fate from the album Melissa
 "Evil", a song by The Flaming Lips from the 2009 album Embryonic
 "Evil", a song by Stevie Wonder from the 1972 album Music of My Mind
 "Evil", a song by Heavenly from the 2004 album Dust to Dust
 "Evil", alter ego of Eminem as one half of the hip-hop duo Bad Meets Evil

Other 
 Evil (wrestler) (born 1987), ring name for Japanese professional wrestler Takaaki Watanabe
 Mount Evil, a mountain in Tennessee, United States
 Evil bit, a fictional internet protocol for "evil" transmissions to identify themselves
 EVIL (electronic viewfinder, interchangeable lens), alternate term for a mirrorless interchangeable-lens camera
 Evil, a web app made by Tom Scott

See also 
 Evil empire (disambiguation)
 Evel (disambiguation)
 Evel Knievel (1938–2007), stunt rider
 Douglas Evill (1892–1971), British air marshal
 King's evil, a disease of the cervical lymph nodes
 Poll evil, a disease of horses and other equids